Quri (Quechua for gold, Hispanicized spelling Juri) is a mountain in the Cordillera Central in the Andes of Peru, about  high. It is situated in the Lima Region, Huarochiri Province, San Mateo District, and in the Junín Region, Yauli Province, Yauli District. Quri lies west of the main branch of the Paryaqaqa or Waruchiri mountain range, southwest of a lake named Wallaqucha (Huallacocha).

References

Mountains of Peru
Mountains of Lima Region
Mountains of Junín Region